George Sutherland (24 February 1876 – 19 November 1956) was an Australian rules footballer who played for  St Kilda in the Victorian Football League (VFL).

Sutherland, a Collegians recruit, was born in Scotland. He made his debut in the opening round of the 1900 VFL season and kicked three goals from full-forward, to help St Kilda register a rare victory. With a season ending tally of 13 goals, Sutherland topped the St Kilda goal-kicking that year.

References

External links

1876 births
VFL/AFL players born outside Australia
Australian rules footballers from Victoria (Australia)
St Kilda Football Club players
Collegians Football Club players
Scottish emigrants to colonial Australia
1956 deaths
Sportspeople from Glasgow
Scottish players of Australian rules football